Bhaarya Illaatha Raathri is a 1975 Indian Malayalam-language film directed by Babu Nanthankode and produced by P. Subramaniam. The film stars Thikkurissy Sukumaran Nair, Hari, Raghavan and KPAC Sunny. The film has musical score by G. Devarajan.

Cast
 
Thikkurissy Sukumaran Nair 
Hari 
Raghavan 
KPAC Sunny 
Kunchan 
Paravoor Bharathan 
Ramachandran Nair
Sripriya 
Udayachandrika

Soundtrack
The music was composed by G. Devarajan and the lyrics were written by Sreekumaran Thampi.

References

External links
 

1975 films
1970s Malayalam-language films